Mycena rosella, commonly known as the pink bonnet, is a species of mushroom in the family Mycenaceae. First called Agaricus roseus by Swedish mycologist Elias Magnus Fries in 1794, it was assigned its current name in 1871 by German scientist Paul Kummer.

 Microscopic characteristics
The spores are amyloid and have dimensions of 7–9 by 4–5 µm.

References

rosella
Fungi of Europe
Taxa named by Elias Magnus Fries